Aman Gill is a film producer born and raised in Vancouver, British Columbia now based in Mumbai, India. He has his ancestral roots hailing from Ludhiana, Punjab   He is known for producing films like Jersey (2021 film), Shehzada (2022 film), Puaada, Shadaa, Udta Punjab, Black (2005 film) amongst others.

Career
He started his career at Applause Entertainment where he was AVP Content from the years 2003 - 2006, in which time he worked as an Executive Producer on Sanjay Leela Bhansali's film Black (2005). In November 2006 he joined Viacom18 Studios where he was the Head of Acquisition & Domestic Distribution of such blockbusters like Ghajini, Golmaal Returns, Singh Is Kinng, Welcome (2007 film), Jab We Met and Namastey London. In 2012 he joined the talent agency CAA-Kwan where he set up their film talent and literary business.  In June 2014 he joined Junglee Pictures as the Chief Content Officer where he overlooked  such films like Dil Dhadakne Do and Talvar.  In April 2015 he joined Balaji Motion Pictures as the CEO Films, where he was responsible for film development, creative, production, marketing, distribution, and syndication. In his time at Balaji Motion Films he produced such films like Udta Punjab, A Flying Jatt, Azhar, Kya Kool Hain Hum 3 and Great Grand Masti.

In the year 2019 he commenced shoot as a producer on the hindi film Jersey (2021 film) starring Shahid Kapoor.  The film was scheduled to release in the year 2020 but due to the Covid 19 pandemic the release was pushed to 31 December 2021. In October 2021 he commenced shoot as a producer on his next hindi film Shehzada (2022 film) which stars Kartik Aryan and Kriti Sanon in the leads directed by Rohit Dhawan, the film is scheduled to release on 4th, November, 2022.

Personal life
He has a twin brother Pawan Gill, who also works in the film industry as a producer and filmmaker. He has produced several blockbuster films including Puaada, Shadaa, Super Singh and Honsla Rakh.

Filmography

Awards

Won
 PTC Punjabi Film Awards 2020 - Best Entertainer Film of the Year Award Shadaa

Nominated
 PTC Punjabi Film Awards 2020 - Best Film Shadaa
 PTC Punjabi Film Awards 2018 - Best Film Super Singh

References

External links
 
 
 
 

Living people
Indian film producers
Film producers from Mumbai
Canadian people of Indian descent
People from Punjab, India
People from Ludhiana district
Year of birth missing (living people)